CCHP may refer to:

 Certified Correctional Health Professional
 Certified Corporate Housing Professional; see National Commission on Correctional Health Care
 consortium of computational human phantoms
 Combined cooling, heat and power, also known as trigeneration
 constant conductance heat pipe
 Chinese Community Health Plan at the San Francisco Chinese Hospital
 Moscow Central Clinical Hospital (CCHP: Central Clinical Hospital of the Administrative directorate of the President of the Russian Federation)

See also

 
 CHP (disambiguation)